William Wallace Phelps (June 1, 1826 – August 3, 1873) was a representative from Minnesota. He was born in Oakland County, Michigan, on June 1, 1826. He attended the country schools and graduated from the University of Michigan at Ann Arbor in 1846, where he was a founding member of the Chi Psi fraternity. He studied law and was admitted to the bar in 1848 and began a practice. (Register of the United States land office at Red Wing, Goodhue County, Minnesota)

Upon the admission of Minnesota as a state into the Union, he was elected as a Democrat to the 35th congress, and served from May 11, 1858, to March 3, 1859. After leaving congress, he resumed the practice of his profession in Red Wing, Minnesota. William Wallace Phelps died in Spring Lake, Ottawa County, Michigan, on August 3, 1873. His interment was in Oakwood Cemetery, Red Wing, Minnesota.

External links

1826 births
1873 deaths
People from Oakland County, Michigan
University of Michigan alumni
Democratic Party members of the United States House of Representatives from Minnesota
19th-century American politicians